Klyugin is a Russian male surname, its feminine counterpart is Klyugina. Notable people with the surname include:

Sergey Klyugin (born 1974), Russian high jumper
Viktoriya Klyugina (born 1980), Russian high jumper, wife of Sergey

Russian-language surnames